Liron Basis is a former Israeli footballer.

Honours
Israel State Cup (1):
1996–97
Israeli Premier League (1):
1998–99
Toto Cup (Leumit) (1):
2004–05

References

1974 births
Israeli Jews
Living people
Israeli footballers
Maccabi Haifa F.C. players
Hapoel Be'er Sheva F.C. players
Hapoel Haifa F.C. players
Maccabi Tel Aviv F.C. players
Beitar Jerusalem F.C. players
Maccabi Petah Tikva F.C. players
Maccabi Netanya F.C. players
Maccabi Ironi Amishav Petah Tikva F.C. players
Israeli Premier League players
Footballers from Haifa
Association football midfielders